Christopher Bell (born 18 November 1957) is a British businessman who was Chief Executive Officer of Ladbrokes from 2006 until May 2010. He is currently Chairman of OnTheMarket, Team17 and XL Media plc.

He was educated at Mexborough Grammar School and Wolverhampton Polytechnic. He was previously Chairman of Game until March 2012, and is a former Chairman of Business in Sport and Leisure.

References

1957 births
Living people
Alumni of the University of Wolverhampton
British businesspeople
Team17
Video game businesspeople